Daphne kamtschatica is a shrub, of the family Thymelaeaceae.  It is native to parts of Korea and Japan, as well as Kamchatka.

Description
The shrub is deciduous, and grows from 30 to 50 cm tall.  It has oblong leaves and small greenish flowers.

References

kamtschatica